The University of Wah (UOW) is a private university located at Wah, Punjab, Pakistan. It was established in 2005. It offers bachelors, masters and doctoral programs in basic sciences, social sciences, management sciences, computer science and engineering.
Its one of the renowned degree is Bachelor of Science in Mechatronics Engineering. Now Wah Engineering College offered MS and PhD programs also and aims to introduce the Artificial Intelligence degree in upcoming years.

Overview
The university of wah is one of the fastest growing engineering institute in Pakistan. The graduates from the university are working in various national and multinational firms like Pakistan Ordnance Factories(POF), Descon Engineering Limited, Heavy Mechanical Complex, etc. The university has two constituent colleges named Mashal Degree College for Women and Wah Engineering College.

Faculties
 Faculty of Engineering (Wah Engineering College) 
 Faculty of Basic Sciences
 Faculty of Computer Sciences
 Faculty of Management Sciences
 Faculty of Social Sciences and Humanities

See also
Wah Engineering College
Mashal Degree College for Girls
Pakistan Ordnance Factories

References

External links
UOW official website
Wah Engineering College official website

Public universities in Punjab, Pakistan
Pakistan Army universities and colleges
Public universities and colleges in Punjab, Pakistan